USS N-7 (SS-59) was a N-class coastal defense submarine built for the United States Navy during World War I.

Description
The N-class boats designed by Lake Torpedo Boat (N-4 through N-7) were built to slightly different specifications from the other N-class submarines, which were designed by Electric Boat, and are sometimes considered a separate class. They displaced  on the surface and  submerged. The N-class submarines had a crew of 3 officers and 26 enlisted men.

For surface running, the Electric Boat submarines were powered by two  diesel engines, each driving one propeller shaft. When submerged each propeller was driven by a  electric motor. They could reach  on the surface and  underwater.

The boats were armed with four 18-inch (450 mm) torpedo tubes in the bow. They carried four reloads, for a total of eight torpedoes.

Construction and career
N-7 was laid down on 20 April 1915 by Lake Torpedo Boat Company in Bridgeport, Connecticut. She was launched on 19 May 1917, sponsored by Mrs Frank Miller, and commissioned on 15 June 1918. After outfitting at New London, Connecticut, she patrolled the New England coast, to guard against attacks by German U-boats, until 17 September, when she put into New York City for upkeep. Returning to New London on 24 October, she remained there until 21 June 1919, when she sailed to Philadelphia, Pennsylvania, for extensive overhaul. She returned to New London on 31 March 1920 and remained there until placed in reserve on 7 June.

She spent 1921 in reserve at New London, except for short cruises to Boston, Massachusetts, and Newport, Rhode Island. Later that year, her engines were transferred to a more modern
L-class submarine. Towed by tug , she departed on 26 January 1922 for Philadelphia, where she decommissioned on 7 February. Her hulk was sold to Joseph G. Hitner of Philadelphia for scrap on 5 June.

Notes

References

External links
 

United States N-class submarines
World War I submarines of the United States
Ships built in Groton, Connecticut
1917 ships